Robert Wylkynson (sometimes Wilkinson) (ca. 1450 – Eton after 1515) was one of the composers of the Eton Choirbook. Wylkynson became parish clerk of Eton in 1496, then in 1500 he was promoted to Informator - the master of the choristers.

Only four works survive: 
 2x Salve Regina
 Jesus autem transiens/Credo in Deum à 13
 motet O virgo prudentissima (fragmentary)

But these works show Wylkynson to have been "an extremely ambitious composer and a more than competent one."

Recordings
Salve Regina Eton Choirbook Vol. I The Sixteen, dir. Harry Christophers
Jesus autem transiens/Credo in Deum à 13. Eton Choirbook Vol. III The Sixteen, dir. Harry Christophers
Jesus autem transiens/Credo in Deum à 13. on À 40 Voix.Huelgas Ensemble, dir. Paul Van Nevel. HMC 801954
Jesus autem transiens/Credo in Deum à 13. Eton Choirbook Tonus Peregrinus

References

1450s births
1510s deaths
Renaissance composers
English classical composers
16th-century English composers
15th-century English composers
English male classical composers
Eton College